Nde-Nsele-Nta, or sometimes simply Nde, is an Ekoid language of Nigeria. There are three somewhat distinct dialects, Nde (60% of speakers), Nsele (Nselle), and Nta.

References

External links
Nde basic lexicon at the Global Lexicostatistical Database

Ekoid languages
Languages of Nigeria